Moyes is a surname.

Moyes may also refer to:

Places:
Cape Moyes, Queen Mary Land, Antarctica
Moyes Islands, George V Land, Antarctica
Moyes Nunatak, Graham Land, Antarctica
Moyes Point, Signy Island, South Orkney Islands

Companies
Moyes Delta Gliders, an Australian aircraft manufacturer
Moyes Microlights, an Australian aircraft manufacturer